Dartmouth College's Alumni Gymnasium, located in Hanover, New Hampshire, in the United States, is the center of Dartmouth College's athletic life and hosts venues for many of Dartmouth's 34 varsity sports. After its completion in 1910, it was considered to be one of the most complete athletic facilities in the Eastern United States. The gymnasium contains two swimming pools, intramural basketball courts, championship basketball courts, two weight rooms, squash courts, 1/13 of a mile jogging track, two saunas, fencing lanes, and a rowing tank for crew training.

Alumni Gymnasium was designed by Charles Rich and Fredrick Mathesius. Construction began in 1909 under College President Ernest Fox Nichols. The cornerstone of the gymnasium contains several historical objects, including a file of the "New Gymnasium News", copies of the student newspaper The Dartmouth, the Dartmouth humor magazine the Dartmouth Jack-O-Lantern, and the yearbook, the Aegis. The building cost approximately $190,000.  In 1938, engineers from the Thayer School of Engineering constructed a springy board track of Canadian spruce around the inside of the gym which was used by Glenn Cunningham to break the American mile record that year. The record was disallowed because Cunningham had been aided by pacing runners.

During World War I, the gymnasium was converted into barracks, and during World War II, was used as an armory and lounge. In 1962-1963 the gym was extensively remodeled to include a new basketball court and added to the Dartmouth College aquatic facilities with the addition of the Karl B. Michael Pool. In 1972, the year the college went coed, a two-story women's locker room was added to the southeast corner.

Alumni Gymnasium completed a $12 million renovation in the spring of 2006.

References

Defunct college basketball venues in the United States
Dartmouth Big Green men's basketball
Dartmouth College facilities
Indoor arenas in New Hampshire
Basketball venues in New Hampshire
Buildings and structures in Grafton County, New Hampshire
1910 establishments in New Hampshire
Sports venues completed in 1910